The Shih Tzu (literally "Hsi Shih dog") is a toy dog breed originating from Tibet and was bred from the Pekingese and the Lhasa Apso.

Shih Tzus are known for their short snouts and large round eyes, as well as their long coat, floppy ears, and short and stout posture. They are well known for their playful personality and their calm and friendly temperament.

They can adapt well to different situations. Due to their highly independent nature, they are not considered the most obedient breed.

Description 

The Shih Tzu is a sturdy dog with a small muzzle and normally has large dark brown eyes. The Chinese have described their head shapes as "owl head" and "lion head", and their mouth as "frog mouths". They have a soft and long double coat that will tangle and mat easily if not brushed at least every 2 or 3 days. A Shih Tzu should stand no more than 26.7cm (10") at the withers and with an ideal weight of 4.0 to 7.5kg (9 to 17 lb).  Floppy ears are covered with long fur, and the heavily furred tail is carried curled over the back. The coat may be of any color, though white and with blazes of grey are frequently seen. A very noticeable feature is the underbite, which is required in the breed standard.

Because of their long coat and fast-growing hair, regular grooming is necessary, which may be expensive. The traditional long silky coat, which tends to reach the floor, requires daily brushing to avoid tangles. The coat can be clipped short to simplify care, but still requires frequent brushing. For showing, the coat must be left in its natural state, though trimming for neatness around the feet and anus is allowed. The shorter cut is typically called a "puppy cut" or a "teddy bear cut" when the puppy cut is accompanied by a fuller, rounder face, resembling a stuffed animal.

Etymology 
The name comes from the Chinese language word for "lion" because this kind of dog was bred to resemble "the lion, as in traditional oriental art". (The Pekingese breed is also called , "lion dog", in Chinese.) The name Shih Tzu is the Wade-Giles romanization of the Chinese characters  ("lion"). 

In contemporary Mandarin, the Shih Tzu is generally known as the "Xi Shi dog"; Xi Shi was regarded as one of the most beautiful women of ancient China. Shih Tzu was nicknamed the "chrysanthemum dog" in England in the 1930s. The dog may also be called the Tibetan Lion Dog, but whether the breed should be referred to as "Tibetan" or "Chinese" is a source of both historical and political contention, as the subsequent section notes. A book on the breed states that "dog historians tend to have very strong opinions" on the subject.

History 
One theory is that the Shih Tzu descended from a cross between the Pekingese and Lhasa Apso. The dogs were favorites of the Chinese royals and so prized that, for years, the Chinese refused to sell, trade, or give any away. The first dogs of the breed were imported into Europe (England and Norway) in 1930 and were classified by the Kennel Club as "Apsos". The first European standard for the breed was written in England in 1935 by the Shih Tzu Club, and the dogs were categorised again as Shih Tzu. The breed spread throughout Europe and was brought to the United States after World War II, when returning members of the U.S. military brought back dogs from Europe and Asia, in the mid-1950s. The Shih Tzu was recognized by the American Kennel Club in 1969 in the Toy Group. There are fourteen total iterations of the Shih Tzu in the breed's gene pool today. In 1934, the Shih Tzu Club of England was founded and the breed was officially recognised by the Kennel Club (UK) on 7 May 1940. When it became eligible for Challenge Certificates, none were awarded until 1949. The breed is now recognized by all of the major kennel clubs in the English-speaking world. It is also recognized by the Fédération Cynologique Internationale for international competition in Companion and Toy Dog Group, Section 5, Tibetan breeds. In the United States, the Shih Tzus were ranked the 15th most popular breed in 2013, falling slightly in popularity since 2012 when it was placed in 11th postion.

Shih Tzus and Buddhist mythology 
Shih Tzus are largely associated with Buddhism and Buddhist mythology. The name "Shih Tzu" in Mandarin directly translates to "little lion," an animal considered sacred in Buddhist religion. Lions symbolize royalty, strength, and bravery – "fear nothing, and act without delay." Pairs of stone lions or lion dogs located outside guard palace doors, tombs, temples, and public buildings are thought to protect these buildings from harmful individuals and spiritual influences. These stone statues are often called Fu (or Foo) dogs, and it is suggested that these are the lionized form of the Shih Tzu. "Fu" roughly translates to "happiness" in Manchurian, with legend stating Fu dogs are happy Shih Tzus forever guarding the temple of Buddha. Fu dog statues typically represent a male and female Shih Tzu, carved out of stone, jade, teak, ivory, cinnabar, bronze or cera, mics. The male dog is often seen holding a ball with his left paw and the female dog holds her puppy. Sources state this holds a symbolic meaning, with the male dog representing powers over nature, energy, wisdom, and precious stones and the female dog symbolizing protection, play, and a disciplinary attitude.

Buddhists consider Shih Tzus blessed by and sacred beasts of Buddha. Legend states Buddha rode to earth on a lion and carried with him a small lion dog which accompanied him everywhere he went. Legends vary across different sources, however many cite the Shih Tzu accompanied the Buddha of wisdom, Manjushri. This lion dog had the ability to turn himself into a lion to carry Manjushri on his back. The physical features of Shih Tzus serve as proof of the eternal connection between Buddha and this breed. According to legend, several robbers surrounded Buddha with the intention of robbing and murdering him when the Shih Tzu transformed into a ferocious lion so large that the robbers were scared and fled the scene. As the Shih Tzu returned to its dog form, Buddha blessed him for his courage. Many Shih Tzus reflect this blessing in the form of the "Star of Buddha", which may also be called "Buddha's kiss", represented as a white patch of hair on the top of dog's head. Markings on the dogs back is said to be the saddle Buddha used to ride the dog in its lion form. Legends vary across sources, largely because legends are historically passed down by word-of-mouth. Some cite this mark on the head as the place where Buddha kissed the dog, giving it his blessing. Other sources state Buddha laid his finger on the dog's forehead in blessing, giving it a flash of white hair on its forehead.

Coat colors 
The Shih Tzu is a small breed of dog with a wide range of coat colors, from black to gold. Standard recognized Shih Tzu colors include black, blue, red, brindle, liver, silver, and gold. Other color variations may also be available like Albino and White, though they may not be recognized by the American Kennel Club. In addition to solid colors, certain breeders are breeding tonal variations in each of these color types such as lighter or darker shades.

Health 
A number of health issues, some of them hereditary, have been found in individual Shih Tzu, and are listed below. The popularity of the breed has allowed for extremely poor breeding in general, leading to generalized and lifelong diseases, often from a fairly early age.

Heart disease
Shih Tzus are prone to multiple types of heart disease. The condition may have a poor prognosis depending on when it is diagnosed and the stage of the disease when it is discovered.

Brachycephaly 

Due to the ideal of beauty regarding the shape of the face the skull malformation brachycephaly was increased by breeding selection. This short nose causes problems like skin sensitivities such as dermatitis, bumps, and rashes.

Eye issues 
It is very common for Shih Tzus to develop eye problems at any age, and even more so once they are older. Most veterinarians will recommend eye drops to assist with any eye irritations. Some dogs have allergies which cause excess discharge around the eye. Older Shih Tzu are known to develop cataracts which can be corrected with surgery. If not treated, the dog may become blind in the eye that has the cataract. The distinctive large eyes can easily be scratched which may cause an ulcer. The dog will normally have the injured eye closed or half closed and may have excessive tears. The most common problem of Shih Tzus concerning eye conditions is the formation of epiphora caused by the fur on the eyelids scratching the conjunctiva and the cornea. However this can be medicated by the application of prescribed eye drops from a certified veterinarian.

Hair issues 

Shih Tzus do not have fur and have hair which can grow lengthy. Long hair is required as a show coat and is required generally to be brushed or groomed once a day. Hair longer than a puppy cut often causes issues, including hair covering the eyes of the dog, preventing good visual acuity.

Ear issues 
A very common issue for Shih Tzus is the development of ear infections, as they have a long coat and hair grows in their ears. If ears are not plucked and cleaned often, ear infections will reoccur and need to be treated with ear cleaner and possibly medication, prescribed by the veterinarian. Ear infections may be spotted by an odor coming from the ears, as well as frequent shaking of the head and scratching of the ears.

Skin sensitivities 
The Shih Tzu's skin is particularly sensitive and prone to allergies. Ideally, they should be bathed every two to six months to maintain hygiene and prevent skin irritations. They are also prone to stomach issues, and most have delicate appetites.

Lifespan 
The UK Kennel Club survey puts the median lifespan of a Shih Tzu at 10 to 16 years. The oldest recorded Shih Tzu lived to 23 years of age.

The oldest living Shih Tzu today is called Tutsy. She was born in September, 2003 in Liverpool,England. The second oldest is Gizmo she was born November 2003, living in New Mexico, USA.

Breeding 
The Shih Tzu will have 3 to 4 puppies at one time on average. Older Shih Tzus will tend to have more puppies per litter. 20% of Shih Tzus give birth via C-section. Young female Shih Tzus will go into their first heat around six months old, repeating the process twice a year unless they are spayed. Traditionally, the breeding process for a Shih Tzu is complicated and time-consuming. The process required constant attention from the owner during the entirety of pregnancy, birth, and the tending of the litter. A pregnant Shih Tzu's stomach can be used to feel for movement as early as 20 days into pregnancy.

Variations

Kennel club differences 
There is a difference between the Shih Tzu of the American Kennel Club and the Kennel Club (UK):

The AKC (American Kennel Club) Shih-Tzu 
 Their front legs (forequarters) are straight. Their hindquarters are muscular. Neither should be too short nor too long. 
 The standard head is big and round and is set high with face looking forward or up.
 The neck and body are the most important and should not be exaggerated.
 The eyes are large and face the front.
 The shoulders of the American type of Shih-Tzu are frontal.

In popular culture 

 The design of the video game character Isabelle from the popular video game franchise Animal Crossing is based on the features of a Shih Tzu, as well as her original name in Japanese, Shizue (しずえ), seemingly being based on the name of the dog breed. She has appeared in most Animal Crossing games since the release of Animal Crossing: New Leaf, and is prominently featured in marketing for the franchise.

See also
 Dogs portal
 List of dog breeds
 Utility Group

References

External links 

Companion dogs
FCI breeds
Dog breeds originating in China
Dog breeds originating in Tibet
Toy dogs